Buzz is the fifth studio album by American glam metal band Autograph. Apart from original lead singer and songwriter Steve Plunkett, the band had a completely new lineup of members. The original lineup of members recorded and released three studio albums from 1984-1987, before disbanding in 1989 with Loud and Clear being the last release. The Buzz lineup did the same in 2005.

Track listing

Personnel
Steve Plunkett - lead vocals, rhythm guitar, keyboards
T.J. Helmerich - lead guitar
Lance Morrison - bass
Matt Laug - drums

Additional personnel
Bart Walsh - lead guitar (tracks 3 and 9)

Production
Produced By Steve Plunkett
Mastered By Lou Hemsey

References

External links
Buzz at Allmusic.com

Autograph (American band) albums
2003 albums